The View of Brussels is a painting by Jan Baptist Bonnecroy. It shows a panoramic view of the city of Brussels in the 17th century.

Legacy 
The work was painted by Jan Baptist Bonnecroy, a Flemish painter from Antwerp, circa 1664-1665.

It belonged to the Dukes of Arenberg.

Around 1960, the painting was sold by Engelbert-Charles d’Arenberg to a New York art dealer, who sent it to the United States.

In 1990, the King Baudouin Foundation’s Heritage Fund was able to purchase the painting and return it to Belgium. The work has been entrusted, on long-term loan, to the Royal Fine Arts Museums of Belgium in Brussels.

Description 
The painting shows a bird’s eye view of the city of Brussels. It is painted looking down from an imaginary height in Sint-Jans-Molenbeek. in the north-west of the city. Bonnecroy would have been unable to see the city from this aerial perspective, proving that he worked in total liberty. He accentuated various buildings in the city, taking inspiration from local land surveys and printed maps.

A number of buildings in the painting can be identified, notably within the inner ring around the Pentagon of the old city. Amongst the buildings represented can be seen:

 The Coudenberg Palace
 The Cathedral of Saints Michael and Gudule of Brussels
 The City Hall
 The choir of the Church of Saint Nicholas
 The Church of the Augustinians
 The Saint John the Baptist at the Béguinage
 The Saint Catherine Church
 The Porte à Peine Perdue (Pointless Gate)
 The Porte Noire (Black Gate)
 The Porte du Rivage (Waterfront Gate)
 The Church of Saint John the Baptist in Molenbeek
 La Grosse Tour (The Big Tower)
 The Church of Our Blessed Lady of the Sablon
 The Saint-Pierre Hospital
 The Halle Gate
 The Jesuit Church 
 The Chapel Church
 The Church of the Place Saint-Géry
 The Porte d’Anderlecht de Ter Cruyskene
 The Petite ecluse (the little lock)
 The Porte de Flandre

References 

Paintings in Brussels